SAIC General Motors Corporation Limited (More commonly known as SAIC-GM; ; formerly known as "Shanghai General Motors Company Ltd", "Shanghai GM") is a joint venture between General Motors Company and SAIC Motor that manufactures and sells Chevrolet, Buick, and Cadillac brand automobiles in Mainland China.

History 
SAIC-GM was founded on June 12, 1997, with 50% investment each from each partner. SAIC-GM began assembling the venture's first vehicle, the Buick Regal, in Shanghai, China in April 1999. This later followed with the Chinese-built Buick GL8 minivan which was a Chinese exclusive vehicle and was not offered in the United States and Canada.

In 2003, China became the second largest single market for General Motors, selling 201,188 vehicles, an 81.6% percent increase over the previous year. In that year SAIC-GM achieved a 13% market share in mainland China, second only to Volkswagen Group China among foreign carmakers. Sales dropped in 2004 when the company retired the Buick Sail and the release of its replacement, the Chevrolet Sail, was delayed to February 2005, knocking General Motors Shanghai to seventh place in mainland China market share. SAIC-GM market share climbed back to nearly 9.8 percent, placing SAIC-GM among the top three passenger car manufacturers in mainland China.

In June 2004, the Cadillac brand was introduced to China then in January 2005, the Chevrolet brand was launched.

In May 2005 SAIC-GM completed construction of a new assembly plant, the South Plant, at its facility in eastern Shanghai's Pudong district, more than doubling its annual production capacity to 320,000 vehicles.

SAIC-GM was the top passenger vehicle producer in China in 2006, with sales of 413,400 vehicles. In 2011, SAIC-GM sold 1,200,355 vehicles in the Chinese market.
SAIC-GM is the largest joint venture GM has in China.

In September 2006, General Motors launched the "Chevrolet Corsa Plus" in Chile, a version of the 4-door Opel Corsa with a 1.6L engine, making it the first export market to receive a vehicle manufactured by SAIC-GM.

In February 2010, SAIC acquired an additional 1 percent stake in the joint venture for US$85 million and assistance in securing a US$400 million line of credit to boost SAIC's total share of SAIC-GM to 51%.

In April 2012, GM regained 50% control of the joint venture.

Current models

Buick

Enclave
Encore 
Encore GX
Envista
Envision
Envision S
Excelle
Excelle GT
Excelle GX
GL6
GL8
LaCrosse
Regal 
Regal GS 
Velite 6
Velite 7
Verano
Verano Hatch/GS 

Notes

Cadillac

CT4
CT5
CT6
Lyriq
XT4
XT5
XT6

Chevrolet

Menlo
Onix
Monza
Malibu XL
Camaro RS 
Tracker
Trailblazer
Blazer
Equinox
Orlando
Silverado 
Colorado 

Notes

Former models

Buick

Enclave 
Excelle XT 
New Century 
Park Avenue 
Roadmaster  
Royaum 
Velite 5 

Notes

Cadillac

ATS 
ATS-L
CTS 
Escalade 
Fleetwood Brougham   
Fleetwood  
SLS
SRX 
XLR 
XTS

Notes

Chevrolet

Aveo
Caprice Classic 
Captiva
Cavalier
Corsica 
Chevrolet Corvette (C4) 
Chevrolet Corvette (C6) 
Chevrolet Corvette (C7) 
Cruze
Epica
Epica II
Lova
Lova RV
Lumina APV 
Malibu
Sail
Spark
Trax

Notes

Sales

See also
 SAIC-GM-Wuling

References

External links

 

Car manufacturers of China
General Motors joint ventures
SAIC Motor joint ventures
Vehicle manufacturing companies established in 1997
Chinese companies established in 1997